The Marxist–Leninist Communist Party of Greece (Marxistiko-Leninistiko Kommounistiko Komma Elladas), better known by its acronym M-L KKE (Μ-Λ ΚΚΕ), is an anti-revisionist Marxist–Leninist communist party in Greece.

History 
M-L KKE originates in the Organisation of Marxists-Leninists of Greece (OMLE) that split away from the Communist Party of Greece (KKE) in 1964, opposing Nikita Khrushchev's De-Stalinization and supporting Mao Zedong and his political beliefs in the Sino-Soviet split. After Mao's death in 1976, OMLE split in two major factions: the M-L KKE and the rival Communist Party of Greece (Marxist–Leninist) (KKE M-L), as well as further smaller groupings. M-L KKE and KKE M-L have remained the two largest Maoist parties in Greece since. Historically, M-L KKE has had a significant presence among teachers and education workers, and is most active in West Macedonia, Alexandroupoli, Corfu, and Ikaria.

The group, which has published its own journal Laikos Dromos, was led from its foundation by Isaac Jordanidis, who had been a functionary within the KKE. Jordanidis was a strong supporter of the Three Worlds Theory and the group took a Maoist line as a result. A delegation from the party travelled to Beijing in 1977 where they held a meeting with Li Xiannian.

In the legislative election of 2000, M-L KKE and A/synechia participated together, receiving 5,866 votes. In the legislative election of 2004, M-L KKE participated alone, receiving 4,846 votes. In the legislative election of 2007, M-L KKE received 8,088 votes (0.11%).

On 16 March 2012, spurred by the ongoing Greek financial crisis, M-L KKE and KKE M-L announced that they would jointly contest elections as part of the Popular Resistance – Left Anti-Imperialist Cooperation (Λαϊκή Αντίσταση – Αριστερή Αντιμπεριαλιστική Συνεργασία), distancing themselves both from the traditional Communist Party of Greece (KKE) and the leftist Syriza coalition.

Newspaper

M-L KKE publishes the Laikos Dromos (Λαϊκός Δρόμος, "People's Path") newspaper, founded in December 1967 as OMLE's newspaper.

Electoral results 

1 Participated in a coalition called Aristera! - M-LKKE with A/synechia
2 In a coalition with the Communist Party of Greece (Marxist–Leninist)

See also
 List of communist parties

References

External links
 

1976 establishments in Greece
Communist parties in Greece
Anti-revisionist organizations
Stalinist parties
Maoist parties
Far-left politics in Greece
Maoist organizations in Greece
Political parties established in 1976